The Convention on Limitation of Liability for Maritime Claims is an IMO treaty that was concluded in London in November 1976. It entered into force in 1986 and superseded the 1957 Brussels Convention of the same name. As of October 2016, 54 states are party to the convention.

Chapter 1
Chapter 1 of the Convention is the Right of Limitation. Chapter 1 of the 1976 Limitation Convention for Maritime Claims includes:
Article 1: Persons entitled to limit liability,
Article 2: Claims subject to limitation,
Article 3: Claims excepted from limitation,
Article 4: Conduct barring limitation and
Article 5: Counterclaims.

The following will discuss two major issues: Article 1: Persons entitled to limit liability and Article 2: Claims subject to limitation, on the problems faced by the previous 1957 Convention and the reason of the improvement made.

Article 1: Persons entitled to limit liability
The 1957 Brussels Convention stated the provisions of the convention will apply to the charter, manager and operators of the ship, and to the master, members of the crew. It has been criticized that an independent agent might not be able to limit the liability as the wordings restrict to one who is involved in the operation of the ship. The Tojo Maru case is the significant example showing this problem.

The most important changes in the 1976 limitation convention is that, "salvors" have been added to the list of persons or parties who may limit their liability in accordance with the rules of the Convention.

Article 1 of the 1976 Convention increases coverage of entitlement of limitation to shipowner, charterers, managers, operators, salvors, insurer of the parties and any person for whose act, neglect or default the shipowner or salvor is responsible.

The 1976 convention recognizes two categories of person entitled to limit, shipowner and salvors. The distinction was introduced to minimize the effect of the decision in the "Tojo Maru".

Article 2: Claims subject to limitation
The 1957 Brussels Convention claimed that the limitation was restricted:
to acts or omissions done by person on board or in the navigation or management of the ship, or
in loading, carriage or discharge of its cargo, or
in embarkation, carriage or disembarkation of its passengers.

The Limitation in the 1957 Brussels Convention was only available in respect of claims sounding in damages. These restrictions become unfortunate nowadays.
In order to solve this problem, The 1976 Convention replaced the list with a wider definition of claims which are subject to limitation.

The Convention refers to events occurring “on board or in direct connection with the operation of the ship, or with salvage operations, and consequential loss resulting therefrom”.

According to the 1976 conventions, the basis of liability shall be subject to limitation of liability
The range of claims in respect of which the right to limit liability is available is greater than those under the 1957 Convention. The two major principal differences are:
Claims qualify for limitation whatever the basis of liability may be.
Claims qualify for limitation if they arise on board or in direct connection with the operation of the ship or with salvage operation.

With a better amendment in the right to limitation, the 1976 convention provides a good protection for the parties.

Summary
The Convention on Limitation of Liability for Maritime Claims 1976 recognized the defects of the 1957 Conventions. Compared with the 1957 Convention, the 1976 Convention provides a better protection and coverage for the parties.

Parties
Although 65 states have ratified the convention, it has only 54 state parties because a number of ratifying states have denounced the convention. New Zealand has ratified the convention and will cease to be a party in October 2017.

See also
 Peracomo Inc. v. TELUS Communications Co. Canadian case concerning the Convention

Notes

References
Hill, C. (1995), Maritime Law, 4th ed, LLP Reference Publishing, London
Griggs, P., Williams, R.(1998), Limitation of Liability for Maritime Claims, 3rd ed, LLP Reference Publishing, London

Admiralty law treaties
Treaties concluded in 1976
Treaties entered into force in 1986
1976 in London
Treaties of Albania
Treaties of Algeria
Treaties of Antigua and Barbuda
Treaties of Azerbaijan
Treaties of the Bahamas
Treaties of Barbados
Treaties of the People's Republic of Benin
Treaties of Bulgaria
Treaties of the People's Republic of China
Treaties of the Republic of the Congo
Treaties of the Cook Islands
Treaties of Croatia
Treaties of Cyprus
Treaties of Dominica
Treaties of Egypt
Treaties of Equatorial Guinea
Treaties of Estonia
Treaties of France
Treaties of Georgia (country)
Treaties of East Germany
Treaties of Greece
Treaties of Guyana
Treaties of Hungary
Treaties of Ireland
Treaties of India
Treaties of Iran
Treaties of Jamaica
Treaties of Kiribati
Treaties of Latvia
Treaties of Liberia
Treaties of Lithuania
Treaties of Luxembourg
Treaties of the Marshall Islands
Treaties of Mauritius
Treaties of Mexico
Treaties of Mongolia
Treaties of New Zealand
Treaties of Nigeria
Treaties of Niue
Treaties of the Polish People's Republic
Treaties of Romania
Treaties of Saint Lucia
Treaties of Samoa
Treaties of Serbia
Treaties of Sierra Leone
Treaties of Singapore
Treaties of Switzerland
Treaties of Syria
Treaties of Tonga
Treaties of Trinidad and Tobago
Treaties of Turkey
Treaties of Tuvalu
Treaties of the United Arab Emirates
Treaties of Vanuatu
Treaties of the Yemen Arab Republic
International Maritime Organization treaties
Treaties extended to Greenland
Treaties extended to the Caribbean Netherlands
Treaties extended to Bermuda
Treaties extended to the British Virgin Islands
Treaties extended to the Falkland Islands
Treaties extended to Montserrat
Treaties extended to the Pitcairn Islands
Treaties extended to Saint Helena, Ascension and Tristan da Cunha
Treaties extended to the Turks and Caicos Islands
Treaties extended to Akrotiri and Dhekelia
Treaties extended to the British Antarctic Territory
Treaties extended to the British Indian Ocean Territory
Treaties extended to South Georgia and the South Sandwich Islands
Liability treaties
Treaties extended to British Honduras
Treaties extended to British Hong Kong